Anisotyma is a genus of beetle in the family Cerambycidae, it contains a single species Anisotyma soteri. It was described by Napp and Monne in 2009.

References

Cerambycinae
Beetles described in 2009
Monotypic Cerambycidae genera